Cegielnia  is a village in the administrative district of Gmina Mogielnica, within Grójec County, Masovian Voivodeship, in east-central Poland.

In the years 1975-1998 the village was a province of Radom .

References

Villages in Grójec County